A Good Man in Africa is a 1994 comedy-drama film, based on William Boyd's 1981 novel A Good Man in Africa and directed by Bruce Beresford. The film starred Colin Friels, Sean Connery, John Lithgow, Joanne Whalley, Diana Rigg and Louis Gossett Jr.

Plot

Morgan Leafy (Colin Friels) is a British diplomat living in Kinjanja, an African nation which has recently become independent from British rule. Arthur Fanshawe (John Lithgow), a new diplomat eager to leave Africa, learns that Kinjanja sits on top of a huge oil reserve. Unfortunately, Morgan is too preoccupied with alcohol and women to know what to do with the oil. To make matters worse, a woman is struck by lightning on the British compound, creating a tense political situation with the Kinjanja government.

Cast
 Colin Friels as Morgan Leafy
 Sean Connery as  Dr. Alex Murray
 John Lithgow as Arthur Fanshawe
 Diana Rigg as Chloe Fanshawe
 Louis Gossett Jr. as Prof. Sam Adekunle
 Joanne Whalley as Celia Adekunle
 Sarah-Jane Fenton as Priscilla Fanshawe
 Maynard Eziashi as Friday, Leafy's Houseman

Reception
The movie received mixed to poor reviews. Roger Ebert said that he felt uncomfortable during the film but praised the performances of Connery, Lithgow and Gossett. Hal Hinson of The Washington Post said that although the film "held the possibility of being a welcome departure from the ordinary [...] ordinary is what it rises to at its best." Janet Maslin of The New York Times opined that "a good book is the basis for "A Good Man in Africa," but its mordant humor has curdled badly on the screen," adding: 

The film's director, Bruce Beresford, did not remember the film fondly:
God, that was horrible. That was the worst film experience I ever had. It was cast wrong, the crew was all strange. We were filming in the wrong place. We filmed in South Africa, it was set in West Africa. Which is like shooting in Alaska when it’s set in New Orleans. And I realized that although the novel that it’s based on is terribly funny, it was very anecdotal. It had no narrative. I think on about the second day I realized it was never going to work, because the scenes don’t link. I thought, “I’m sunk! I’m never gonna get out.”

DVD release
Focus Features released an Amazon.com exclusive DVD of the film on 11 January 2010.

References

External links
 
 
 

1994 comedy films
1994 films
Adultery in films
Films based on British novels
Films directed by Bruce Beresford
Films scored by John Du Prez
Films set in Africa
Gramercy Pictures films
American political satire films
Films with screenplays by William Boyd (writer)
1990s English-language films
1990s American films